Schwarmstedt is a municipality in the Heidekreis in Lower Saxony, Germany. It is situated near the confluence of the rivers Aller and Leine, approx. 20 km south of Bad Fallingbostel, and 30 km east of Nienburg. Further districts of the municipality are
 
 

Schwarmstedt is the seat of the Samtgemeinde ("collective municipality") Schwarmstedt.

Transportation 
The Bundesstraße 214 leads through Schwarmstedt, connecting the cities of Nienburg/Weser and Celle. Schwarmstedt is nearby the A 7 and has a train station for the line section Soltau - Hannover (Heidebahn).

History 
The area around the church of Schwarmstedt (ecclesia swarmstede) have been
donated by the Edelherr Mirabilis to the Bishopric of Minden around 1150AD.
The old church of Schwarmstedt was replaced around 1500AD by a new church (St. Laurentius Church), which stands to this day. It is presumed that the land changed ownership at the end of the 14th century and was then owned by the duchy of Braunschweig-Lüneburg.

Politics

Municipal council 
data as of 22/01/2012
SPD - 12 seats
CDU - 5 seats

Town twinnings 
Schwarmstedt is twinned to Kröpelin (Mecklenburg-Western 
Pomerania) and Miekinia in  the polish Lower Silesian Voivodeship.

Famous persons 
The macroeconomist Wilhelm Röpke was born in Schwarmstedt on 10 October 1899. He worked as a scientist and political advisor in post-war Germany and had a relevant influence on its development at that time. The local school was named after him in his honor.

References 

Municipalities in Lower Saxony
Heidmark